Guindulungan, officially the Municipality of Guindulungan (Maguindanaon: Ingud nu Guindulungan; Iranun: Inged a Guindulungan), is a  municipality in the province of Maguindanao del Sur, Philippines. According to the 2020 census, it has a population of 24,933 people.

It was created under Muslim Mindanao Autonomy Act No. 139 on March 31, 2003, carved out of the municipality of Talayan.

The first appointed mayor during its creation as a new municipality was Hadji Datu Antao Midtimbang, Sr., a well known religious leader who also served as mayor of Talayan and as vice governor of Maguindanao Province. The municipality is inhabited by 99% Maguindanaons.

Geography

Barangays
Guindulungan is politically subdivided into 11 barangays.

Ahan
Bagan
Datalpandan
Kalumamis
Kateman
Lambayao
Macasampen
barrio Muslim
Muti
Sampao
Tambunan II

Climate

Demographics

Economy

References

External links
Guindulungan Profile at the DTI Cities and Municipalities Competitive Index
MMA Act No. 139 : An Act Creating the Municipality of Guindulungan in the Province of Maguindanao
[ Philippine Standard Geographic Code]
2000 Philippine Census Information
Local Governance Performance Management System 

Municipalities of Maguindanao del Sur